The following are the national records in athletics in Tajikistan maintained by the Athletic Federation of the Republic of Tajikistan (AFT).

Outdoor
Key to tables:

h = hand timing

NWI = no wind information

# = not ratified by federation or/and IAAF

Men

Women

Indoor

Men

Women

References
General
World Athletics Statistic Handbook 2019: National Outdoor Records
World Athletics Statistic Handbook 2018: National Indoor Records
Specific

External links

Tajikistan
Records
Athletics